Metaxmeste staudingeri is a moth in the family Crambidae. It was described by Hugo Theodor Christoph in 1873. It is found in Iran.

References

Moths described in 1873
Odontiini